is a Paralympian athlete from Japan competing mainly in category T53 wheelchair racing events.

Jun competed at the 2000, 2004 and 2008 Summer Paralympics where like many wheelchair racers he competed in events as diverse as the 200m and marathon but both of his medals, a silver in 2000 and bronze in 2004, came in the 800m.

References

Paralympic athletes of Japan
Athletes (track and field) at the 2000 Summer Paralympics
Athletes (track and field) at the 2004 Summer Paralympics
Paralympic silver medalists for Japan
Paralympic bronze medalists for Japan
Living people
Athletes (track and field) at the 2012 Summer Paralympics
Japanese male wheelchair racers
Paralympic wheelchair racers
Medalists at the 2000 Summer Paralympics
Medalists at the 2004 Summer Paralympics
Year of birth missing (living people)
Paralympic medalists in athletics (track and field)
21st-century Japanese people